Polia's shrew (Crocidura polia) is a species of mammal in the family Soricidae. It is endemic to Democratic Republic of the Congo.

Sources
 Hutterer, R. & Howell, K. 2004.  Crocidura polia.   2006 IUCN Red List of Threatened Species.   Downloaded on 30 July 2007.

Crocidura
Endemic fauna of the Democratic Republic of the Congo
Mammals described in 1916
Taxonomy articles created by Polbot
Northeastern Congolian lowland forests